Arthur John Hayward (born 12 September 1905, date of death unknown) was an English first-class cricketer. Hayward was a right-handed batsman who bowled leg-break googly. He was born in Christchurch, Hampshire.

Hayward represented Hampshire in four first-class matches, the first of which came in 1925 against Middlesex. Hayward's final first-class match came in 1926 against Northamptonshire.

Hayward's date of death is unknown.

External links 
 Arthur Hayward at Cricinfo
 Arthur Hayward at CricketArchive

English cricketers
Hampshire cricketers
1905 births
Year of death missing
People from Christchurch, Dorset
Cricketers from Dorset